St. Mary's Stadium-Kitende is a Ugandan sports stadium for the Sports Club Vipers SC, a football club playing in Uganda's top league Uganda Premier League. Its capacity is 15,000 with more than 1,000 VIP seats.
On 3 March 2017, the African football governing body, CAF, cleared the then newly constructed St Mary's Stadium to host football games. St. Mary's stadium is the home of SC Vipers, located in Kitende on Entebbe Road and was built by the club patron and former FUFA president, Lawrence Mulindwa.

The stadium is considered one of the finest stadiums in East Africa. It is the first artificial turf pitch stadium to be established in Uganda and East Africa. It is the second largest stadium in Uganda next to the Mandela National Stadium.

Other stadiums in Uganda

The St. Mary’s Stadium is currently the second largest stadium in Uganda.

References

National stadiums
Football venues in Uganda
Athletics (track and field) venues in Uganda
Vipers SC